Apollo is the name of two characters in the Battlestar Galactica universe:

Original Continuity

Apollo is the son of Commander Adama & Ila.  He is played by Richard Hatch (who also portrays Tom Zarek in the 2004–2009 series Battlestar Galactica). Apollo has a sister Athena, also a Warrior, and a brother Zac who was killed in a Cylon ambush prior to their attack on the 12 colonies. Apollo's mother was killed in the attack on the colonies.

New Continuity

In the re-imagining of the franchise, introduced in the 2003 miniseries Battlestar Galactica, Apollo is no longer the character's name but rather his call sign (although Laura Roslin calls him 'Captain Apollo' anyway, as "it has a nice ring to it"). His real name is Lee Adama and he is portrayed by Jamie Bamber.

Also in re-imagining, Apollo is the name of one of the Twelve Lords of Kobol, the Colonials' gods. Apollo is the son of Zeus, and Lord of the Hunt and Lord of Healing.

Lord Apollo is symbolized by the Arrow of Apollo, a religious artifact brought from Caprica to Kobol.

Battlestar Galactica characters